Ayumi Morita, the 2008 champion, tried to defend her title, but was eliminated in the quarterfinals by Bojana Jovanovski Petrovic . Kimiko Date won the tournament after beating Bojana Jovanovski Petrovic 7–5, 6–2 in the final match.

Seeds

Draw

Finals

Top half

Bottom half

References 

 Main Draw
 Qualifying Draw

Women's Singles